Betty, also known as Mrs Betty and Queen Betty, is believed to have been the name of the niece of Cockacoeske who succeeded her as Weroansqua or chief of the Pamunkey tribe, a Native American tribe of Virginia, in the late 1600s to early 1700s.

History

On 1 July 1686, the Council of Virginia was informed of the death of Cockacoeske, ruler of the Pamunkey for 30 years:
 

Though the new ruler is described as Cockakoeske's niece, her name is not given.  The name "Ms. Betty Queen ye Queen" appears in a land transaction of 1702, and by 1708 "Queen Ann" is mentioned.

The Dictionary of Virginia Biography suggests that Betty and Ann may have been the same person:

References

People of the Powhatan Confederacy
17th-century women rulers
18th-century women rulers
Female Native American leaders
Tribal chiefs
Pamunkey people
17th-century Native American women
18th-century Native American women
18th-century Native Americans